Abhijit Dey (born 30 December 1987) is an Indian first-class cricketer who plays for Tripura.

References

External links
 

1987 births
Living people
Indian cricketers
Tripura cricketers
Place of birth missing (living people)